Jayantbhai Ramanbhai Patel, popularly known as Boskey is an Indian politician and member of the Nationalist Congress Party (NCP). Boskey is currently serving as the president of Gujarat NCP.

Early life and education 

Boskey was born in Aden (a city in South Yemen) on 16 May 1960. He acquired his primary schooling in the Bhagalpur district of Bihar at Mt. Carmel Convent School and at C.M.S. High School. He completed his graduation in Commerce from Vallabh Vidyanagar (B.J.V.M.).

Later in the year 1988, Boskey was married to Rita Patel, a Commerce Graduate from Mumbai College, Mumbai. They had their first child, Unnati Patel, in the year 1989 and their second child, Krishna Patel, in 1991.

Inclination towards Sports 

Boskey had an innate inclination towards cricket and football during his school and college days. In the year 1976-77, he played for Bihar School Boys in The Cooch Behar Trophy. In the following year, he played as a goalkeeper in the football team of Bihar School Boys. In the year 1979-80, he played cricket along with Rubin Mukherji's Tata team at the Junior County, Q.K. London. He has also played for the Bhagalpur Senior District team against the cricket teams of Patna, Bihar, etc. He is keenly interested in cricket.

Political career 
Boskey was elected as the MLA from 134 Sarsa Constituency in the year 1990. In the year 1992, he was selected as the Parliamentary Secretary to the honorable Chief Minister (સંસદીય સચિવ) and contributed to the fields of Youth Service, Sports Affairs, and Public Grievance.

Offices held 
1990-1995: MLA, 134 Sarsa Constituency

2007-2012: MLA, 134 Sarsa Constituency

2012-2017: MLA, 111 Umreth Constituency

2005: President, Gujarat NCP

2017: General Secretary, Gujarat NCP

2020–present: President, Gujarat NCP

References 

 State NCP chief Jayant Patel to contest from Anand

Year of birth missing (living people)
Living people
People from Anand district
Gujarat MLAs 2012–2017
Nationalist Congress Party politicians from Gujarat
Gujarat MLAs 1990–1995
Gujarat MLAs 2007–2012
Gujarat MLAs 2017–2022